A Piece of the Action or Piece of the Action may refer to:
 "Piece of the Action", a 1981 song by Bucks Fizz
 "Piece of the Action" (Meat Loaf song) (1984)
 A Piece of the Action (film), a 1977 American comedy crime film
 A Piece of the Action (soundtrack)
 "A Piece of the Action" (Star Trek: The Original Series), a 1968 episode of Star Trek: The Original Series
 "A Piece of the Action" (Batman), a 1967 episode of Batman
 "A Piece of the Action", an episode of Robot Chicken
 "A Piece of the Action", an episode of Cyberchase
 "A Piece of the Action", a 1962 episode of The Alfred Hitchcock Hour.